Prittwitz is the name of a Silesian noble family of the Wczele coat of arms, whose first documented member is one Petrus de Prawticz from 1283.

Among its members are:
 Bernhard von Prittwitz († 1561), officer in the service of the Polish crown
 Carl Bernhard Baron von Prittwitz und Gaffron from the house of Lorzendorf (1735–1786), Royal Prussian Lieutenant Colonel, Chamberlain to Elisabeth Christine, Hofmarschall to the King of Prussia, Allod of Krippitz and Ulsche in Silesia
 Moritz Karl Ernst von Prittwitz (1795–1885), Royal Prussian Lieutenant-General of Infantry, Supervised the building of the large fortress in Ulm
 Ernst von Prittwitz und Gaffron (1833–1904), Royal Prussian Lieutenant-General
 Maximilian von Prittwitz (1848–1917), German general

 Friedrich Wilhelm von Prittwitz und Gaffron (1884–1955), German Ambassador to the United States under the Weimar Republic, from 1928 until April 14, 1933
 Heinrich von Prittwitz und Gaffron (1889-1941), German general killed during the Siege of Tobruk as a Commander of the 15th Panzer Division

Notes

References
 Prittwitz, Robert von: Das von Prittwitz’sche Adelsgeschlecht. Aus den aufgesammelten Nachrichten zusammengestellt, Wilhelm Gottl. Korn, Breslau 1870 (in German)

Silesian nobility